Butyrophilin subfamily 2 member A2 is a protein that in humans is encoded by the BTN2A2 gene.

Function 

Butyrophilin is the major protein associated with fat droplets in the milk. This gene is a member of the BTN2 subfamily of genes, which encode proteins belonging to the butyrophilin protein family. The gene is located in a cluster on chromosome 6, consisting of seven genes belonging to the expanding B7/butyrophilin-like group, a subset of the immunoglobulin gene superfamily. The encoded protein is a type 1 receptor glycoprotein involved in lipid, fatty-acid and sterol metabolism. Several alternatively spliced transcript variants of this gene have been described, but the full-length nature of some variants has not been determined.

References

Further reading

External links